Pernell Whitaker vs. Jake Rodríguez, billed as "Collision Course" was a professional boxing match contested on November 18, 1995 for the WBC and lineal welterweight titles.

Background
For the fifth defense of his WBC and lineal welterweight titles, Pernell Whitaker was matched against Jake Rodríguez. Rodríguez was a former IBF light welterweight champion had previously been the chief sparring partner of Whitaker's, working as such for both of Whitaker's previous fights against Julio César Vásquez and Gary Jacobs. Having sparred with Rodríguez for 100 rounds, it was one of the rare occasions that Whitaker had come into a fight with knowledge of his opponent as he did not study any video of his opponents prior to his fights. Whitaker would enter the fight as a 10–1 favorite over Rodríguez.

The co-main event featured Félix Trinidad defending his IBF welterweight title against the IBF's number-one ranked contender Larry Barnes. Trinidad would win the fight by technical knockout in the fourth round. The expected victories of Trinidad and Whitaker was expected to set up a unification bout between the two welterweight champions at some point in 1996. However, the two fighters were unable to reach an agreement to face one another until 1999.

The fight
Whitaker had little trouble with Rodríguez, using his superior hand-speed and counter punching to dominate the fight. After five one-sided rounds in his favor, Whitaker would end the fight in the sixth. Midway through the round, a series of body shots followed by a right-left combination sent Rodríguez to his knees. Rodríguez would get up and continue the fight but Whitaker sent him down again with a left hand to the body. Rodríguez was unable to answer the 10-count and Whitaker was named the winner by knockout at 2:45 of the round. It was Whitaker's first knockout in a title fight since his KO of Juan Nazario in 1990.

Fight card

References

1995 in boxing
1995 in sports in New Jersey
Boxing on HBO
November 1995 sports events in the United States
Boxing matches at Boardwalk Hall